Phymatoceros is the only genus in the hornwort family Phymatocerotaceae and order Phymatocerotales.  It includes only two species.

References

External links

Hornworts
Bryophyte genera